Wigry Suwałki is a Polish football club based in Suwałki,  Podlaskie Voivodeship. In the 2022–23 season, they will compete in IV liga, having withdrawn from II liga due to financial reasons. They play their home games at the Stadion Miejski.

Current squad

Out on loan

Former players

  Michael Sanni

Reserved numbers

References

External links 
 
Wigry Suwałki unofficial website
Wigry Suwałki at 90minut.pl

 
Association football clubs established in 1947
1947 establishments in Poland
Sport in Podlaskie Voivodeship